Cytostasis (cyto – cell; stasis – stoppage) is the inhibition of cell growth and multiplication. Cytostatic refers to a cellular component or medicine that inhibits cell division.

Cytostasis is an important prerequisite for structured multicellular organisms. Without regulation of cell growth and division only unorganized heaps of cells would be possible.

Chemotherapy of cancer, treatment of skin diseases and treatment of infections are common use cases of cytostatic drugs. Active hygienic products generally contain cytostatic substances.

Cytostatic mechanisms and drugs generally occur together with cytotoxic ones.

Activators
Nitric oxide – activated macrophages produce large amounts of nitric oxide (NO), which induces both cytostasis and cytotoxicity to tumor cells both in vitro and in vivo. Nitric oxide-induced cytostasis targets ribonucleotide reductase by rapid and reversible inhibition. However, other studies show there could be other targets that are responsible for producing long-lasting cytostasis in cells.

Lipopolysaccharide (LPS) and lipid A-associated protein – studies have demonstrated that LPS and LAP are potent macrophage activators that have been shown to stimulate tumoricidal (cytostatic) activity in vitro. LAP and LPS were shown to stimulate C3H/HeJ macrophages to kill target tumor cells. It was concluded that LAP can deliver at least one of the triggering signals necessary for inducing macrophage activity that leads to cytostasis.

Polyunsaturated fatty acid – N-3 and n-6 polyunsaturated fatty acids were found to have a distinct effect on cell growth in certain human urothelial cells. Cystostatic concentrations of n-3 and n-6 PUFA did not induce apoptosis, but did cause permanent cellular growth arrest by effecting the cell cycle. Study shows that metabolites of the lipoxygenase pathway are involved with the antiproliferation induce by PUFA. However, PUFA cytostatic activity is not tumor-specific.

Medical uses

Cytostatic agents have been beneficial in fighting tumors with their ability to induce cell growth arrest.

Breast cancer – One study indicates nitric oxide (NO) is able to have a cytostatic effect on the human breast cancer cell line MDA-MB-231. Not only does nitric oxide stop cell growth, the study shows that it can also induce apoptosis after the cancer cells have been exposed to NO over 48 hours.

Malignant epithelium – Long-chain polyunsaturated fatty acids inhibit cell division, cause cell cycle arrest, and can induce cell death in malignant epithelial cells from various tissue organs in vitro.

See also
 Chemotherapy

References

Cellular processes